Mascaró is a surname of Catalan origin, meaning "figurehead" or "mask". It may refer to:
Joan Mascaró, Spanish translator
John Mascaro, American painter and architect
John Mascaro, American singer-songwriter
José María Mascaro, Mexican field hockey player 
Roberto Mascaró, Uruguayan poet and translator
Steven Mascaro, American politician from Utah